Karl Joseph Alfred Hedenstierna (1852-1906) was a Swedish author.

Biography
He was born at Skeda in the Småland province. In 1879, he joined the staff of the Smålandsposten at Växjö, and in 1890 was made editor-in-chief of that newspaper. In addition to several volumes descriptive of Swedish peasant life, he wrote a series of humorous articles, published weekly in the Posten over the pseudonym “Sigurd.” A selection of the latter articles were collected and translated into German by Krusenstierna and Langfeldt, and entitled Allerlei Leute (Leipzig, 1892–97).

Notes

References

External links

1852 births
1906 deaths
Swedish male writers
Swedish journalists
People from Småland